Under is an underwater restaurant in Lindesnes, Norway. Its dining room is found 5.5 metres below sea level. The eating floor is 495 square metres, making it the biggest underwater restaurant in the world, with a capacity of 40 people. It is the only underwater restaurant in Europe, and only the third to be found worldwide. Under also doubles as a sea lab, facilitating research in marine biology. The restaurant was designed by Norwegian architecture-firm Snøhetta.

The head chef is Danish Nicolai Ellitsgaard and the restaurant's culinary focus is to showcase the  diversity of what the ocean and land has to offer from the southern part of Norway. The restaurant operates with a tasting menu consisting of around 18 to 22 dishes.
The creations by Chef Ellitsgaard and his team was awarded with one star in the Michelin Guide after being open for less than one year.

Background 

The idea for the restaurant was created by entrepreneur-brothers Stig and Gaute Ubostad. The project became official in autumn 2016. The restaurant opened the 20th of March 2019. The total price for the project was 70 million Norwegian kroner, equal to 7 million Euros or around 8.5 million USD.

The project has received widespread media attention. The day of opening, 7.500 people had already booked a table. Journalists from over 30 countries were present.

"Under" in Norwegian carries a double meaning, meaning both under and wonder.

Photos

External links 

 
 Under - MICHELIN Guide’s Point Of View, Restaurant entry in the Michelin Guide.

References 

Restaurants in Norway